Siah Rud Poshteh (also Romanized as Sīāh Rūd Poshteh; also known as Sīāh Rūd) is a village in Rostamabad-e Shomali Rural District, in the Central District of Rudbar County, Gilan Province, Iran. At the 2006 census, its population was 152, in 41 families.

References 

Populated places in Rudbar County